The Corporations Act 1718 (5 Geo. I, c. 6) was an Act of the Parliament of Great Britain. The Act stated that members of municipal corporations were no longer required to take the oath against resistance nor to sign the repudiation of the Solemn League and Covenant. No person would be removed or prosecuted if they failed to take the sacramental test "unless such person be removed or such prosecution be commenced within six months of such person's being placed or elected into his respective office".

Notes

Great Britain Acts of Parliament 1718